The Nekrasovskaya line is the fifteenth metro line of the Moscow Metro. The first segment, between Kosino and Nekrasovka, was opened on 3 June 2019. The second segment was opened on 27 March 2020. City officials expect it to relieve passenger traffic on the Tagansko-Krasnopresnenskaya line once completed.

From 17 February to 19 February 2023, the section of the line from Elektrozavodskaya to Nizhegorodskaya was closed in order to connect it to the Bolshaya Koltsevaya line. On 20 February, the section was transferred from the Nekrasovskaya line to the Bolshaya Koltsevaya line.

Name
During construction, the line was referred to as the Kozhukhovskaya line. One concern about the name, which comes from a small village in the region, is that there is already a Kozhukhovskaya station on the Lyublinsko-Dmitrovskaya line that got its name from a different village with the same name. Therefore there was the possibility of confusion.

The city opened a vote via its Active Citizen portal to rename the line to the Nekrasovskaya line. The respondents voted in favour with 73.4% supporting the name change. As of November 2018, the official Moscow Metro map referred to the line as the Nekrasovskaya line. This marked the second time in two years that Moscow residents voted for a name change for a new transit line. In 2017, a similar vote resulted in a name change for the Bolshaya Koltsevaya line from its working name – Third Interchange Contour.

Stations

References

 
Moscow Metro lines
Railway lines opened in 2019